James Sproat Brown (February 1, 1824April 15, 1878) was an American lawyer and politician who became the first Attorney General of Wisconsin.  He also served one term as mayor of Milwaukee, Wisconsin, and represented Wisconsin's 1st congressional district in the United States House of Representatives during the 38th Congress (1863–1865) as a member of the Democratic Party.

Early life and education

Brown was born in Hampden, Penobscot County, Maine, to Enoch Brown and his wife, the former Melinda Padelford, on February 1, 1824. He received private education from Professor Joseph Emerson Worcester, completing a college-level education by the time he was 16.  His father died that same year. The 16-year-old Brown moved west to Cincinnati, Ohio, studying law and learning to speak German, supporting himself by teaching school.  Because the Ohio State Bar Association did not permit members under age 20, Brown was admitted to the neighboring Kentucky Bar Association at age 18.

Career

Brown remained in Cincinnati and was admitted to the Ohio State Bar in 1843.  While living there, he became acquainted with Catholic priest Father John Henni who, in 1843, became the first Archbishop of Milwaukee.  In 1844, Archbishop Henni convinced Brown to follow him to Milwaukee.  Although only 21, Brown quickly distinguished himself as an attorney in the Wisconsin Territory and, in 1845, was elected prosecuting attorney of Milwaukee County.

Brown soon established a law partnership with Thomas L. Ogden, who was from New York (and with whom he lived), and James Halliday.  In 1848, in the election that also ratified the Constitution of Wisconsin, Brown was elected on the Democratic Party ticket as the state's first Attorney General—he was 24 years old.  Though a candidate for renomination in 1849, the Democratic party instead nominated S. Park Coon at their convention in Madison on the first ballot.

In the heated political climate preceding the American Civil War, an arsonist tried to burn down his house in 1858 but only succeeded in destroying a woodshed. Brown was also part of a group that attempted to establish a law school in Milwaukee, but failed, so the fledgling Milwaukee Bar Association remained a social group. Elected—without opposition—the 13th mayor of Milwaukee in 1860, Brown took office in 1861 and restored the city's credit, as well as purchased the city's first steam engine fire truck and paid fire company. He declined to run for re-election in 1862, facing criticism for his handling of a bank riot in June 1861 as well as for cuts in the police budget.

Instead in 1862, Brown ran for Congress as a War Democrat and defeated incumbent Republican John F. Potter to represent Wisconsin's 1st congressional district. He served one term in the United States House of Representatives during the 38th Congress, from March 4, 1863, to March 3, 1865. In 1864 he ran for re-election but was denounced as anti-Union and ultimately withdrew from the race. Union General Halbert E. Paine, a Republican, succeeded to the seat. Brown would challenge him and lose in 1866.

After his loss in 1866 and suffering from health problems, Brown traveled to Europe with his second wife, Emily.  By 1869 the Browns were in Dresden in the Kingdom of Saxony (present day Germany). They returned to the United States in 1873, where he practiced law once again in Milwaukee and managed his various real estate investments.

Personal life and family

Brown married twice. His first wife, the former Elizabeth Shepard (1835–1863) of New York, was a decade his junior and they had sons Clarence S. Brown (1856–1925) and James (1859–1913). Mrs. Elizabeth Brown died in 1863 shortly after Brown began his term in Congress.

In 1865, after leaving office, Brown married Emily J. Stetson (1815–1902) the widow of former Maine Congressman Charles Stetson, who had died in 1863.  They had no further children, and she survived him.

Brown's elder son Clarence was also elected district attorney of Milwaukee county, serving in the 1890s.

Death and legacy

Brown died in 1878 in Chicago, Illinois, at age 54, survived by his two sons and second wife. After a service in his Milwaukee home led by a Unitarian minister, his body was interred beside his first wife at Milwaukee's Forest Home Cemetery, where his sons would also be buried. His former house in Milwaukee (a double structure he built in 1852) survives, the oldest house in the former Yankee Hill neighborhood, and is a historic site. His son Clarence Brown graduated from Harvard Law School and became an alderman.

Electoral history

Wisconsin Attorney General (1848)

| colspan="6" style="text-align:center;background-color: #e9e9e9;"| General Election, May 8, 1848

Wisconsin Attorney General (1849)

| colspan="6" style="text-align:center;background-color: #e9e9e9;"| Vote of the Wisconsin Democratic Convention, September 6, 1849

U.S. House of Representatives (1862)

| colspan="6" style="text-align:center;background-color: #e9e9e9;"| General Election, November 4, 1862

U.S. House of Representatives (1866)

| colspan="6" style="text-align:center;background-color: #e9e9e9;"| General Election, November 4, 1866

References

External links
 
 

|-

1824 births
1878 deaths
People from Hampden, Maine
Mayors of Milwaukee
Wisconsin Attorneys General
Lawyers from Milwaukee
Democratic Party members of the United States House of Representatives from Wisconsin
19th-century American politicians
19th-century American lawyers